The 1934–35 NWHL season was the second season of the North West Hockey League, a minor professional ice hockey league in the Northwestern United States and Canada. Five teams participated in the league, and the Vancouver Lions won the championship.

Regular season

Note: The Calgary and Edmonton teams were disbanded on February 26 due to poor attendance and high travel costs.

Playoffs

Semi-final
Best of 3

Vancouver Lions beat Portland Buckaroos 2 wins to 1.

Final
Best of 5

Vancouver Lions beat Seattle Seahawks 3 wins to 2.

External links
Season on hockeydb.com

1934 in ice hockey
1935 in ice hockey